Manoranjan Roy (born ) is a Bangladeshi male weightlifter, competing in the  category and representing Bangladesh at international competitions. He participated at the 2010 Commonwealth Games in the 77 kg event.

Major competitions

References

1985 births
Living people
Bangladeshi male weightlifters
Weightlifters at the 2010 Commonwealth Games
Commonwealth Games competitors for Bangladesh
Place of birth missing (living people)
Weightlifters at the 2014 Commonwealth Games